Auto-trolling, self-cyberbullying, digital Munchausen or digital self-harm is a form of self-abuse on the Internet.  It is usually done by teenagers posting fake insults on social media, attacking themselves to elicit attention and sympathy.  A study in 2012 found that about 35 per cent of those who did this felt better.  Studies in 2016 and 2019 found an increase in prevalence in American adolescents rising from 6 to 9 per cent. In a 2011 study, boys were more likely than girls to admit to digital self-bullying. In a 2022 study published by researchers Justin Patchin, Sameer Hinduja, and Ryan Meldrum,  US youth who engaged in digital self-harm were between five and seven times more likely to have considered suicide and between nine and fifteen times more likely to have attempted suicide.

In the UK, a woman was cautioned in 2009 for trolling herself on Facebook and then jailed for 20 months for repeat offences during 2011–12.

References 

Digital media use and mental health